A needs assessment is a systematic process for determining and addressing needs, or "gaps", between current conditions and desired conditions or "wants".

Needs assessment is part of planning. It can be used to clarify problems and identify appropriate solutions. Needs assessments require sufficient data. Needs assessments can help improve policy or program decisions, individuals, education, training, organizations, communities, or products.

There are three types of need in a needs assessment; perceived need, expressed need and relative need.
 Perceived needs are defined by what people think about their needs, each standard changes with each respondent. 
 Expressed needs are defined by the number of people who have sought help and focuses on circumstances where feelings are translated into action. A major weakness of expressed needs assumes that all people with needs seek help.
 Relative needs are concerned with equity and must consider differences in population and social pathology.

History 
Considered the "father of needs assessment", Roger Kaufman developed a model for determining needs defined as a gap in results. This particular emphasis in results focuses on the outcomes that result from products, processes, or inputs. Kaufman argues that an actual need can only be identified independent of premature selection of a solution. To conduct a quality needs assessment according to Kaufman, determine the current results, articulate the desired results, and the distance between results is the actual need. Once a need is identified, then a solution can be selected. Kaufman's model identifies needs at the societal level, "Mega" planning, along with needs at the Macro (organizational) and Micro level (individuals and small groups). Organizational elements vary among the three different levels: outcomes at the Mega level, outputs at the Macro level, and products at the Micro level.

Extensive vs. intensive 

Extensive research uses a large number of cases to determine the characteristics of a population while intensive research examines one or a few cases in depth. A variety of data collection and decision making tools and processes can be used for each, including the following examples (also see ).

The use of population-based indicators is common in extensive needs assessments and has several strengths. These strengths include that such data are available for broad geographical areas, available on a large number of individuals or cases, allow description of entire populations, allow trend analysis over time, are relatively easy to access, inexpensive to use, and perceived as unbiased. Another method commonly used in extensive needs assessments is the survey. The strengths of the survey method are: they allow for direct feedback to the public as well as stakeholders, can foster public awareness about a problem or concern, can be customized to address specific issues, can be targeted to specific population groups or geographic areas, and can provide very timely results. An additional potential data source for extensive needs assessments are service and program databases. The strengths of this source of data are: they often contain data collected over many years, are readily accessible by existing program staff, provide the most current data, and they are relatively inexpensive to operate and maintain.

One type of extensive needs assessment is SWOT analysis. SWOT stands for strengths, weaknesses, opportunities, and threats. The basic process involves gathering information about an organization's activities and outcomes within a set time period. The SWOT process is as follows:

Recruit research group of 10-20 stakeholders or core group members for one to three meetings lasting approximately two hours each.
Generate a list of successes and failures of the group or organization over the past year. Allow for some limited discussion of each, without dwelling on any.
Generate a list of the group's or organization's strengths and weaknesses, and the external environment's opportunities and threats, based on the understanding of successes and failures.
Brainstorm ideas for maximizing strengths and minimizing weaknesses while taking advantage of the environment's opportunities and neutralizing its threats.

Once the group has identified needs, they then generally turn to intensive needs assessment in order to rank the identified needs so they can choose what they will address. An important thing to note is that while the ambitious may want to dive right into their list of needs, generally money and time constraints do not allow for all needs to be addressed and that is where an intensive needs assessment is useful.

Intensive needs assessment requires the ranking of priorities. While there are many methods to rank needs, it is important to develop ranking criteria. Feasibility is often used as criteria, but it is often useful for a group to identify their own set of criteria. This part of the research is not so much concerned with developing a detailed plan for solving the needs situation, but rather for examining the depth of the need and potentially required resources. Force field analysis, developed by Kurt Lewin, is one method for facilitating determining needs feasibility. An example taken from Stoecker1 states that if, "for example, feasibility is defined as degree of staff expertise and time, or funds to buy expertise and time, the force field analysis can look for data indicating available staff expertise and time and/or available external funds and expertise". The illustration below displays a model force field analysis.

As mentioned previously, the use of population-based indicators does have several strengths; however, it also has several weaknesses. These include that such data reveal problems more readily than they do solutions, may not include specific variables of interest, are difficult to alter in terms of type of data collected, not always available in a timely manner, and any individual data point may be of questionable validity. Population-based indicators data are thus not generally useful for intensive needs assessments. Service and program databases are also not useful data sources for intensive needs assessments, because they do not provide data on unmet needs that are not directly addressed by the given service or program, address demand for only that program or service, only provide data for those who seek and participate in the program or service, and some data elements may be of uncertain quality. The use of surveys, however, can be appropriate for intensive as well as extensive needs assessments. Regardless of the method used, intensive needs assessments typically allow deeper analysis and greater flexibility in terms of type of data collected. While often not as convenient as extensive needs assessments, they can be quite useful for determining needs in a small setting. One method of data collection for intensive needs assessments is a structured group. Some strengths of this method are: 1) it allows account of many different perspectives, as they involve diverse sets of people, including the target audience, key informants, stakeholders, and the general community, in direct conversation; 2) it can foster acceptance of and cooperation with the entire needs assessment process within the community and various target populations; 3) it accounts for opinions, perceptions, and desires in a manner that no other method does; 4) it generates new ideas about an existing problem as well as potential solutions; 5) it can be conducted relatively quickly and provide immediate feedback; and 6) it is relatively inexpensive. However, because intensive needs assessments typically require much more coordination and planning in the data collection phase and it is often inappropriate to generalize from them, extensive needs assessments seem to be much more common.

Examples
The "Santa Clara County Trends & Needs Assessment Report" is an extensive community needs assessment conducted by United Way Silicon Valley, a non-profit organization that claims to be a leading expert on human needs in Silicon Valley. The report's purpose is to define and measure the most pressing needs in Santa Clara County.

An example of an intensive needs assessment is a project conducted by the Environmental Law Institute, titled Building Capacity to Participate in Environmental Protection Agency Activities: A Needs Assessment and Analysis. In that study, in-depth interviews with open-ended questions were conducted with experts on citizen participation in environmental issues and community capacity building. The purpose of the interviews was to identify: 1) areas most in need of an investment in capacity building; 2) capacity building tools and techniques that are perceived to be effective by communities and citizens; 3) effective mechanisms for delivering capacity building tools; and 4) approaches that could be taken to implement capacity building efforts. After the interviews were conducted, the next step was to analyze each need and approach that had been identified by the interviewees and accordingly identify possible constraints and barriers to implementation, design issues, and potential efficacy for each approach in addressing perceived capacity building needs. Another phase of this needs assessment, occurring concurrently with the others and informing the construction and analysis of the various approaches examined, was a literature review on public participation relevant to capacity building.

Needs chain model
A needs chain model is a framework that allows organizations to simultaneously consider the individuals' needs within an organization and the organization's needs, in order to prioritises resources and identify areas of improvement for the organization. Once the organization has completed the model, it gives them a better picture of the organization's priorities. One of the benefits of this model is that it can be used to help decision makers quickly come to solutions for priorities that may change over time.

A needs chain model is composed of aligned horizontal and vertical processes, in which there are four different kinds of needs that describe and identify the ultimate performance goal, solutions, and what might affect these solutions. These needs include:

 Performance need: A state of existence or level of performance required for satisfactory functioning.
 Instrumental need: An intervention, product, or substance that is required to obtain a satisfactory level of functioning in a particular context.
 Conscious need: Need that are known to those who have them.
 Unconscious need: Need that is unknown to those who have them.

Also, it has four vertical factors that consider:

 Organizational need: Needs that usually pertain to behavior or tangible outcomes, such as market share or sales target.
 Individual needs: Needs that usually pertain to the individual's attitudes about the organization or themselves, such as job satisfaction.
 Causes
 Level of objectivity for all needs: The objectivity level requires all needs to have a certain level of objectivity and to be based on deep investigation or further analysis.

The needs chain model provides tools that assist organizations in prioritizing resources and identifying areas that require improvement. Figure 1 identifies four main types of need that must be considered, for example, for determining the organization's goals and the instrument needs with full understanding of the unconscious needs while a different factor determines the objectivity level.

Data about each of these levels comes from different data collection methods:

Organizational level: Goals of the organization
Individual level: Surveys or interviews 
The most difficult data to collect in this model are the unconscious needs. In order to gather this information about the individual, careful methods must be used to allow for trust from the individual while discussing sensitive topics about their thoughts on the organization.

Training needs assessment
Training needs assessment is a systematic inquiry of training needs within an organization for the purposes of identifying priorities and making decisions, and allocating finite resources in a manner consistent with identified program goals and objectives. Though beginning with training as the desired solution, it has been argued, diminishes the value of the needs assessment, the popularity of the term "training needs assessment" has made it part of the training and adult learning lexicon.

There are three levels of training needs assessment:

Organizational assessment evaluates the level of organizational performance. An assessment of this type will determine the knowledge, skills, ability, and other characteristics (KSAOs) that are needed within the organization. It also identifies what is required to alleviate the problems and weaknesses of the agency as well as to enhance strengths and competencies. The organizational assessment takes into consideration factors such as changing demographics, political trends, technology, and the economy.

Occupational assessment examines the knowledge, skills, abilities, and other characteristics (KSAOs) required for affected occupational groups. The occupational assessment identifies how and which occupational discrepancies or gaps exist, as well as examining new ways to do work that could fix those discrepancies or gaps.

Individual assessment analyzes how well an individual employee is doing a job and determines the individual's capacity to do new or different work. An individual assessment provides information on which employees need training and what kind.

Community

A community needs assessment is a combination of information gathering, community engagement and focused action with the goal of community improvement. A community needs assessment identifies the strengths and weaknesses (needs) within a community. A community needs assessment is also unique and specific to the needs within a community and is usually an extension of a community's strategic planning process. The community needs assessment places great emphasis on the abilities of the people in the community, and on the agencies and organizations within that community that provides services to the children and families. Community leaders, local government, advocacy groups or a combination of these then address these identified needs through policy change or development.

A community needs assessment can be broadly categorized into three types based on their respective starting points: First, needs assessments which aim to discover weaknesses within the community and create a solution (Community Needs Assessment I). Second, needs assessments which are structured around and seek to address an already known problem or potential problem facing the community (Community Needs Assessment II). Third, needs assessments of an organization which serves the community (domestic violence centers, community health clinics etc.) (Community Needs Assessment III).

Community needs assessments are generally executed in four steps: planning and organizing, data collection, coding and summarizing the needs assessment results, and sharing the results with the community to facilitate action planning. During the planning and organizing phase stakeholders are identified, local organizations and/or local government begin to collaborate. Depending on the type of needs assessment being conducted one can tailor their approach.

Types and strategies for planning and organizing

Community needs assessment I – This type of needs assessment seeks to evaluate the strengths and weaknesses within a community and create or improve services based on the identified weaknesses. Organizing this type of needs assessment is primarily structured around how to best obtain information, opinions, and input from the community and then what to do with that information. This process may be broken into targeted questions which can direct the project overall. The following are sample questions taken from "A Community Needs Assessment Guide" from The Center for Urban Research & Learning:

 Define goals for the needs assessment.
 What is the specific purpose of the needs assessment?
 How will the data from the community be used; to set a new agenda, support a new program or support new changes in service delivery or policies?
 What is the timeline for the needs assessment?
 If applicable, identify the target population. How will a sample from the population be chosen? Are there any special considerations which need to be considered in the most effective way to approach/obtain information and cooperation from said population?

Community needs assessment II – This type of needs assessment is constructed around a known problem or potential problem facing the community for example, disaster preparedness, how to address an increase in violent crime etc. This type of community needs assessment centers less around the direct involvement of the community but rather the governing entities, stakeholders, businesses, advocacy groups and organizations which will be potentially affected or can contribute to the community need. Potential organization questions could include:

 Identifying relevant stakeholders. This includes stakeholders affected by the problem or stakeholders of the program/or solution being addressed. The program staff, the funders, and the consumers of the program.
 Learn more about the community and its residents.
 Review already existing material regarding the community problem or potential problem.
 Sharing expectations, goals, and approach regarding the needs assessment with the other partners.
 Discuss and identify potential users of the agenda/solution likely to be generated by the needs assessment process.

Community needs assessment III – This final type of needs assessment is based within an organization which either serves the community at large, is currently addressing a need within the community, or is dedicated to an under-served population within the community. This type of needs assessment centers around improving the efficiency or effectiveness of such organizations. Potential organization questions could include:

 Learn about the organizational culture and its philosophy by interviewing staff, including the executive director.
 Review existing materials regarding the community need and the organization.
 Tour the community and learn more about the target population or problem the organization serves.
 Conduct a literature review to see what the recent research has to offer, review relevant archival information and what previous needs assessments by the organization have found.
 Where is the program in terms of the implementation and development of service delivery?
 What current resources do the organization and its programs offer?
 Identify and learn about the program that would most benefit from a needs assessment.

Implementing a community needs assessment – The exact methodology to implementing a community needs assessment is partially determined by the type of assessment that is being performed (discussed above). However, general guidelines can be proposed.

Use of focus groups
Creating a needs assessment survey
Collecting and analyzing data
Community public forums
Producing a final report and planning action committees

Selecting members of a focus group first requires choosing a target community, population, or demographic which will structure the community needs assessment. This information guides the selection process for a focus group. The principle of the focus group is to select members who are diverse yet share a degree of commonality. This may sound paradoxical yet it isn't necessarily. Generally speaking the commonality between focus group members is a vested interest and stake in their community. Thus, focus group members might include: "local politicians, business owners, block club leaders and community activists. Another focus group would consist of adult resident of the community; and a third consisting of youth residents of the community".

Focus groups solicit input from community members on broad, open-ended questions, such as:

 What do you like about your community?
 What concerns you within your community?
 How would you improve your community?
 What changes do you foresee/fear/want to see in your community within the next 10 years?

Questions such as these can help target potential strengths, weaknesses, opportunities and needs for change or growth.

With the targeted objectives discovered in the focus group, the community needs assessment survey can be created and dispersed. 	

Leaders of the community needs assessment can then summarize the data through computer analysis programs such as Access or SPSS. The results are then brought to the community through a public forum.

Public forums are the place where the information collected through the survey, the identified strengths, weaknesses, and concerns of the community are presented for open public discussion.

Finally, the results of the focus groups, survey, and public forum present a direction which the final report can detail. Action groups are formed and solutions and guidelines are enacted to ensure the changes desire are realized.

Local governments
Local city governments have a department dedicated to the sole purpose of funding nonprofit organizations that see about the current needs of the children and families who reside in that city. The purpose of these departments is to ensure that nonprofit organizations that receive funding from the Children, Families Department will provide families with children with the necessary services that are essential to children growing up healthy, have access to a quality education, and thrive in safe homes and neighborhoods. An example is the Department of Children, Youth and Their Families in San Francisco, California. This specific city department conducts a needs assessment every three years to develop a strategic plan to guide the department during their funding cycle when they send out a request for proposal (RFP) for organizations to apply for grants, which will enable these community organizations to continue to provide services to the children and families in their community.

Conduction 
According to  "the goals of a 'needs assessment' is to identify the assets of a community and determine potential concerns that it faces". A needs assessment therefore becomes crucial in the initial stages of an intervention. A needs analysis is focused on identifying the possible barriers to successful program intervention in a community and possibly finding solutions to these challenges. Service providers in Monitoring and Evaluation (M&E) work are also concerned with assessment and provision of services to different stakeholders. Such services may include an assessment closely related to a needs assessment that focuses on whether current services are effective or not, and if not, identifying the gaps in implementation; or an assessment of whether potential services are likely to be effective once they have been implemented. These assessments highlight the close relationship between needs assessment, monitoring, and evaluation; while each applies similar tools, each also has independent objectives and requires unique skills.

In community development work, practitioners are concerned with identifying barriers that stand in the ways of positive community progress. In many cases, an organization or community is faced by challenges with regards to some social issue, provision or access to services and it is the job of the practitioner, in consultation with stakeholders, to decide about how best to go about finding helpful interventions and implementing solutions to this.

A community level needs assessment is beneficial and crucial to any planned intervention on behalf of communities facing difficulties with regard to some community issue. A community level needs assessment will assist the practitioner to determine the nature and scope of a problem at which an intervention might be aimed, with the aim of finding out what possible interventions might be successful in alleviating the problem. A community needs assessment will also uncover which members of the community are most likely to benefit from a planned intervention and who might not be. Community level needs assessment will also give direction to planners in terms of where resources need to be allocated for the intervention so that they are not wasted. Community level needs assessments should include the community at all stages of planning, and should consider all people that might be affected by the planned intervention, including children, the elderly and the mentally ill.

Tools

There are a number of components in a community level needs assessment, all of which are aimed at gathering data that will answer what the practitioner needs to know and inform the decisions that he or she makes. According , the following are crucial components of a community level needs assessment.

Assessment

Community demographics

Community demographics assist the practitioner to get a feel of the field that they are working in.

Consumer leadership

Consumer leadership assessment is an assessment of the frequency with which community members use or are likely to use an existing or planned service. This assessment is meant to give an indication of the need for the existing or proposed intervention or service. Consumer leadership assessment is meant to give an indication of the different types of leadership activities and roles that are related to transformation in relation to some health or social issue that is being addressed. This may give an indication as to the degree of the need for an intervention or not.

Service gaps

An assessment of service gaps is meant to give an indication of the types of services that are needed the most at the particular point of time in which the assessment is being conducted. A scale measuring the availability, accessibility, provider choice and cultural responsiveness of services, rated on a scale from 0-no availability/non-existent, to 3-outstanding and responsive is provided by the National Consumer Supporter Technical Assistance Center. The scale also assesses the availability of other services in the community such as support groups, education and employment services that may be of interest to the practitioner.

Methodology and data collection

The following are the actual tools that can be involved in the process of gathering data to be used in the community needs assessment.

Community/social survey

Surveys can be used especially in relation to the gathering of community demographics where a large number of people may be involved, and also in which multiple variables such socio-economic status, education levels and employment are being measured in relation to the planned intervention. Large scale surveys involving many people can reveal useful information, while smaller surveys may be less generalizable and used only in the context within which they are conducted. Survey design will vary depending on context, such as internet and phone surveys for well resourced communities or face to face surveys for less resourced communities.

Community mapping

Often, a practitioner may be wanting to implement a service that they think will be of benefit to the community. The problem facing the practitioner will be where and how to place the service at a particular point in the community, and whether that service is likely to be used. Community mapping is where the practitioner gets people in the community to draw a map of the community of the places that they visit the most and how often they go there. This will give an indication of where to locate a service so that it is conveniently placed and accessible to community participants whom it is intended to service. The problem may arise where there are differences between the places that people visit.

Seasonal calendar

A seasonal calendar allows the practitioner to look at seasonal trends that may affect the use or implementation of a service in a community. Seasonal trends may reveal decreases in the supply of labour, periods of hunger that may affect for example school children's performance at school and so on. Seasonal calendars may reveal important reasons for the gaps between service utilization and intervention outcomes. This will allow the practitioner to plan for other things that may not have been considered as part of the intervention but which will greatly improve the quality of the intervention and make life better for the community members. To use the seasonal calendar as a data collection tool, the practitioner gets community members to write a list of the things that they have to do throughout the year. These things are related to work, cultural activities, certain times of the year in which participants are unavailable at all and so on, and to plot how they share them with other members of the community.

Focus group sessions

Focus groups are sessions in which community members can answer questions about different aspects of the intervention in the form of planned discussions. This is a good opportunity to actually find out about the needs and concerns of the community. It is also a good opportunity for addressing service gaps and what needs to be done about them.

Examples

 examined significant statistics that showed a need within the community of Bayview Hunters Point in order to "identify gaps in service delivery system to create a road map for improving neighborhood conditions by rationalizing the allocation of city dollars to social service programs". For example, in 2003, 174 children were removed from family homes in the Bayview; this is more than 18% of all children removed from their family in San Francisco. Such numbers could signify a need within the foster care system or family resources.
The author also looked at the broad-based survey, Project Connect, which gathered data from 10,330 households specifically about their needs for services and current service utilization practices in the summer of 2004. The analysis from 1,551 Bayview households showed that their priorities, in order, are 1) childcare services, 2) health services, 3) tutoring/educational services, 4) immigrant services, 5) foodbank/meal services.

 developed a model focused at the community level they term community needs analysis. Their model involves identifying material problems/deficits/weaknesses and advantages/opportunities/strengths, and evaluating possible solutions that take those qualities into consideration. This differs from Kaufman's Mega model, which focuses on identifying societal-level needs).

Community needs assessment involves assessing the needs that people have in order to live in:
an ecologically sustainable environment
a community that maintains and develops viable social capital
a way that meets their own economic and financial requirements
a manner that permits political participation in decisions that affect themselves

Community needs assessment as a technique thus forms a part of an Ecologically Sustainable Community Economic Development (ESCED). It forms a first step in any project that aims to secure:
Ecological enhancement: minimizing ecological impact or ameliorating any ecological damage
Social vitality: building a community that meets all the social and human needs of its members
Economic resilience: "shock-proofing" local "green" business enterprises as much as possible
Political participation in ways that ensure the participation of people in political decisions that affect them

Community needs assessment has especial usefulness in action-learning projects, and in ensuring that organizations meet green objectives of:
social justice
participatory democracy
non-violent resolution of conflict
ecologically sustainable development
A cross-sectional study of the mental health beliefs and perceptions was conducted which employed a combination of interviewer-administered questionnaires that explored the levels of awareness, current practices, attitudes and stigma concerning depression and suicide among a randomly selected quota sample of community members in Ireland. Community needs assessments can be used for a variety of reasons. Communities are the experts in their own experience. In order to define and create solutions for communities, needs assessments should be conducted.

The "Santa Clara County Trends & Needs Assessment Report" is an extensive community needs assessment conducted by United Way Silicon Valley, a non-profit organization that claims to be a leading expert on human needs in Silicon Valley. The report's purpose is to define and measure the most pressing needs in Santa Clara County.

An example of an intensive needs assessment is a project conducted by the Environmental Law Institute, titled Building Capacity to Participate in Environmental Protection Agency Activities: A Needs Assessment and Analysis. In that study, in-depth interviews with open-ended questions were conducted with experts on citizen participation in environmental issues and community capacity building. The purpose of the interviews was to identify: 1) areas most in need of an investment in capacity building; 2) capacity building tools and techniques that are perceived to be effective by communities and citizens; 3) effective mechanisms for delivering capacity building tools; and 4) approaches that could be taken to implement capacity building efforts. After the interviews were conducted, the next step was to analyze each need and approach that had been identified by the interviewees and accordingly identify possible constraints and barriers to implementation, design issues, and potential efficacy for each approach in addressing perceived capacity building needs. Another phase of this needs assessment, occurring concurrently with the others and informing the construction and analysis of the various approaches examined, was a literature review on public participation relevant to capacity building.

See also

 Environmental impact assessment
 Futures techniques
 Requirements analysis

References

Citations

Bibliography

Further reading

 Altschuld, J. W. (2010). The Needs Assessment KIT. (ed.). Thousand Oaks, CA: SAGE Publications. [5 volume series]—outlines a three-phase generic needs assessment model, consisting of Phase I (what's known, getting organized and determining priorities), Phase II (collection of new data), Phase III (designing, implementing, and evaluating solutions).
 Burton, J. & Merrill, P. (1991). Needs assessment: Goals, need and priorities. In L. J. Briggs, K.L. Gustafson, and M.H. Tillman (Eds.), Instructional design: Principles and applications (2nd ed.). Englewood Cliffs, NJ: Educational Technology.—Explores developing effective instructional educational material. Four basic elements include: identifying a broad range of potential goals, prioritize goals, identify discrepancies between expected and actual performance, and prioritize actions.
 Gilbert, T. (1978). Human competence: Engineering worthy performance. New York: McGraw-Hill.
 Gordon, S. (1994). Systematic training program design: Maximizing effectiveness and minimizing liability. Englewood Cliffs, NJ: Prentice Hall.
 Hannum, W. & Hansen, C. (1989). Instructional systems development in large organizations. Englewood Cliffs, NJ: Educational Technology—Outline a general steps for a needs assessment to create a training program. Hannum and Hansen suggest identifying the purpose, sample data, and expected impact for each of the following steps: organizational environment, baseline performance data (what's the expected and actual level, target audience, training policy.
 Kaufman, R. (1972). Educational system planning. Englewood Cliffs, NJ: Prentice Hall.
 Kaufman, R. (1992). Strategic planning plus: An organizational guide (Rev. ed.). Thousand Oaks, CA: Sage.
 Mager, R. F. & Pipe, P. (1997), Analyzing performance problems (3rd ed.). Atlanta, GA: Center for Effective Performance.
 Murk, P.J. & Wells, J.H. (1998). A practical guide to program planning. Training & Development Journal, 42(10), 45–47.
 Nelson, R., Whitener, E., & Philcox, H. (1995). The assessment of end-user training needs. Communications of the Association for Computing Machinery, 38(7) 27–39.
 Ostroff., C & Ford, J.K. (1989). Assessing training needs: Critical levels of analysis. In I.L. Goldstein (Ed.), Training and development in organizations. San Francisco: Jossey-Bass.
 Robinson, D.G. & Robinson, J.C. (1995). Performance consulting: Moving beyond training. San Francisco: Berrett-Koehler.—Applies a performance perspective to needs assessments. The model includes developing a performance relationship map and identifying operational business needs.
 Rothwell, W.J. & Kazanas, H.C. (1992). Mastering the instructional design process: A systematic approach. San Francisco: Jossey-Bass.—Applies typical needs assessment steps to identifying human performance problems, including clarifying objectives, target audience, sampling procedures, data collection methods, instruments and protocols, data analysis methods, and description of action plan based on data found.
 Rummler, G.A. & Brache, A.P. (1990). Improving performance: How to manage the white space on the organization chart. San Francisco: Jossey-Bass.
 Witkin, B.R. & Altschuld, J.W. (1995). Planning and conducting needs assessments: A practical guide. Thousand Oaks, CA: Sage.—A three-phase model for conducting a needs assessment to fit a variety of situations.

Sociological theories